Tropp is a surname. Notable people with the surname include:

Barbara Tropp (1948–2001), American orientalist, chef, restaurateur, and food writer
Corey Tropp (born 1989), American ice hockey player 
Joel Tropp (born 1977), American mathematician